Kuchesar Fort, (alternatively known as Rao Raj Vilas Kuchesar Fort) is located at Kuchesar, in Bulandshahr, Uttar Pradesh, India, approximately 84.3 kilometers (52.4 miles) east of Delhi.

The fort served as the erstwhile seat of the Jat Kingdom of Uttar Pradesh.

In 2007, the fort was restored and turned into a hotel by Ajit Singh  known as the Rao Raj Vilas  Fort Kuchesar or Rao Raj Vilas, and has become a popular tourist attraction for the city. The resort preserves the fort's mid-18th century influences and reflects the vibrant mix of cultures.

The Rao Raj Vilas Kuchesar Fort is the best heritage in Bulandshahr district. It is the fort converted into a resort near Delhi. It is also known for being a wedding destination near Delhi, and referred as a weekend getaway. The Rao Raj Vilas Kuchesar Fort, located 80 km away from Delhi, was built in 1734 in Bulandshahr, Uttar Pradesh. The Kuchesar Fort is 24 km away from the bank of the Ganges. The Kuchesar Fort is surrounded by 100 acres of flowering tree forest, and thus the Fort rests on seven towers. Kuchesar Fort is recognized as Rao Raj Vilas Kuchesar Fort.

History
Kuchesar Fort was built in 1734 as an opium trading post, by the rulers of Kuchesar, which belonged to the Dalal clan of the Jat people. In 1763 Afrasiab Khan, governor of nearby Koyal, took over the fort with a plot involving a royal eunuch spiking drinks with opium. The Jat rulers reclaimed the fort in 1782 and have held it ever since. After the Pashtun Najib ad-Dawlah bestowed the Jat family with the title of Rao Bahadur, the fort served as the seat of the Jat Kingdom of Uttar Pradesh. After the decline of the Mughal Empire, the Jat people competed with Marathas, Rohillas, French colonists, traders, explorers, and the British East India Company for control of the area. In 1790, the fort was granted to Ajit Singh's family on a perpetual lease by Mughal Emperor Shah Alam II. This grant was reaffirmed by the British in 1803. Kuchesar Fort was also a Center for the Rai Brahmins or Bhatts (a branch of the Kashmiri Brahmins), who were the Rajkavi of Kuchesar State, performing a role similar to that of a poet laureate.

In 2007, the Kuchesar Fort was restored by Ajit Singh. The Kuchesar Fort is named Rao Raj Vilas Kuchesar Fort because Rao Raj Vilas is an older section structured in 1732 by Umrao Singh's Ancestor. Since 2007, the Rao Raj Vilas is a heritage hotel as the architecture consists of both Mughal and British.

The beauty of the Rao Raj Vilas Kuchesar Fort makes it unique to be a wedding destination near Delhi. Rao Raj Vilas Kuchesar Fort is famous for being a weekend getaway for the people of Delhi. Its royal architecture and the mesmerizing structures of the Fort make it the best wedding destination near Delhi. The Rao Raj Vilas Kuchesar Fort is just 8 km from Kuchesar Railway Station. Its magnificent rooms like king suites, queen suites  make it the best resort near Delhi.  We organize several events and activities on regular basis

Role of Kuchesar In Indian History 
Kuchesar Fort plays a significant role in Indian History. The inception of the Fort was done during the Mughals, and the British took over in 1803. The Kuchesar's rulers built the Fort. The chronology of the Kuchesar Fort is as follows –

Kunwar Inderjit Singh (son of Rao Giriraj Singh from his first wife)
Kunwar Sarjit Singh (Rao Giriraj Singh from his second wife)
KunwarGurdyal Singh
Kunwar Ajit Singh           
Anant Jeet Singh (son of KunwarAjit Singh)
AnekJit Singh (son of KunwarAjit Singh

The Rao Raj Vilas Kuchesar Fort is a heritage hotel located in Kuchesar. The Kuchesar Fort served as the former seat of the Jat Kingdom in Uttar Pradesh. The Rao Raj Vilas Kuchesar Fort is beautiful heritage and impressive than it is portrayed in its photographs. The Fort has royal, pastoral parts, which are ideal for a wedding location, making it a great wedding destination in India, just as the cores of the Fort are perfect for an extravagant royal wedding.

The established area of the Fort, tracing back to the 1730s belongs to Kunwar Ajit Singh, the grandson of Rao Giriraj Singh, who is the last Rao Bahadur of Kuchesar. He holds part of the stronghold as his home, and the other segment has been made into a royal hotel, being overseen by his children Anant Jeet Singh and AnekJit Singh.

The heritage hotel named Rao Raj Vilas, Kuchesar, has been re-established and is being overseen by the owner's family. It has been in function since 2007. Neemrana revamped the other part of the Fort. From the mid-18th century, the Fort has been excellently preserved and reworked into one of India's top exotic heritage hotels.

Rao Raj Vilas Kuchesar Fort is a tourism place near Delhi some of Bollywood films, songs shoot here The Hungry film by Bomila Chatarjee starcast Naseeruddin Shah, Tisca Chopra

Geolocation 
The fort is located in the Ganges River basin 24 kilometers from the bank of the river. Located at Kuchesar, in Bulandshahr, Uttar Pradesh, India, approximately 84.3 kilometers (52.4 miles) east of Delhi.

Restoration and present-day operations

The old section of Kuchesar Fort is known as "Rao Raj Vilas".  In 2007, residents began to restore the fort, Neemrana Hotels transforming it into a heritage-style hotel known as Mud Fort Kuchesar or Rao Raj Vilas. The restoration project included the design and construction of a new dining hall, swimming pool, and residential units for families, the balconies of which bear a resemblance to Mughal architecture with their arches and lattice edges. The structure has a mixture of Indian hospitality and elements of the British era. Mud Fort Kuchesar has also become a popular tourist attraction for the city. Scenes from the 2017 Indian film The Hungry, starring Naseeruddin Shah and Tisca Chopra, were filmed there.

References

External links 
 Kuchesar Fort, website
 

Google map location

Forts in Uttar Pradesh
Heritage hotels in India
Bulandshahr district
18th-century establishments in India
18th-century forts in India